Akuapem, also known as Akuapim, Akwapem Twi, and Akwapi, is one of the principal members of the Akan dialect continuum, along with Bono and Asante, with which it is collectively known as Twi, and Fante, with which it is mutually intelligible. There are 626,000 speakers of Akuapem, mainly concentrated in Ghana and southeastern Cote D'Ivoire. It is the historical literary and prestige dialect of Akan, having been chosen as the basis of the Akan translation of the Bible.

Etymology 
The name Akuapem is thought to derive from either Akan nkoa apem ("thousand subjects") or akuw-apem ("thousand companies").

History 
Akuapem's orthography was first developed by missionaries at the Gold Coast Basel Mission in 1842, but its written history begins in 1853 with the publication of two grammars, the German Elemente des Akwapim Dialects der Odshi Sprache and the English Grammatical Outline and Vocabulary of the Oji Language with especial reference to the Akwapim Dialect, both written by Hans Nicolai Riis, nephew of the Gold Coast Basel Mission's founder Andreas Riis. These would not be followed in the bibliography of Akuapem writing until the translation of the New Testament.

Akuapem was chosen as a representative dialect for Akan because the missionaries at Basel felt it a suitable compromise. Christaller, who had himself learned Akyem but believed Akuapem was the better choice, described the issue, and its solution, in the introduction to his 1875 Grammar of the Asante and Fante language called Tshi:It [Akuapem] is an Akan dialect influenced by Fante, steering in the middle course between other Akan dialects and Fante in sounds, forms and expressions; it admits peculiarities of both branches as far as they do no contradict each other, and is, therefore, best capable of being enriched from both sides.

Bible 
Akuapem's history as a literary dialect originates with its selection to serve as the basis of the Akan translation of the New Testament, published in 1870 with a second edition in 1878, and the entire Bible, published in 1871. Both were written by the Gold Coast Basel Mission, principally by German missionary and linguist Johann Gottlieb Christaller and native Akan linguists and missionaries David Asante, Theophilus Opoku, Jonathan Palmer Bekoe, and Paul Keteku.

Despite the publication of the Bible, Akan literacy would not be widespread among the Akan for some time, nor even among the European colonizers. For instance, when British officer Sir Garnet Wolseley, who was and still is known in Ghana as "Sargrenti" (a corruption of "Sir Garnet"), began his campaign into Ghana during the Third Anglo-Ashanti War in 1873, he intended to address his summons to war to Asante king Kofi Karikari in English and Asante, only to find that, to their knowledge, "no proper written representation of the Fante or Asante dialect existed", delaying the dispatch of the summons for almost two weeks; all this even though an Akuapem New Testament had existed for three years and the entire Bible for two.

Grammar and dictionary 
Christaller's A Grammar of the Asante and Fante language called Tshi (1875) and A Dictionary of the Asante and Fante language called Tshi (1881), written with reference to Akuapem, remain the definitive academic grammar and dictionary of Twi, despite the dialects' orthography, vocabulary, and grammar having changed in the century since their publication.

Phonology

References 

Kwa languages
Languages of Ghana
Akan